Vladimir Kaptiev (born 14 July 1987) is a Bulgarian football forward who currently plays for Botev Ihtiman.
He is the younger brother of Rosen Kaptiev.

Career
Vladimir had previously played for Pirin Blagoevgrad, Balkan Botevgrad, Spartak Pleven, Dunav Ruse, Cherno More Varna, Botev Kozloduy, Spartak Varna and Oborishte.

In July 2017, Kaptiev joined Kariana Erden.
In July 2018, he returned to Oborishte.

References

1987 births
Living people
People from Blagoevgrad Province
Bulgarian footballers
OFC Pirin Blagoevgrad players
PFC Spartak Pleven players
FC Dunav Ruse players
PFC Cherno More Varna players
PFC Spartak Varna players
FC Oborishte players
FC Pirin Razlog players
FC Septemvri Simitli players
Makedonikos F.C. players
FC Sportist Svoge players
Association football forwards
First Professional Football League (Bulgaria) players
Second Professional Football League (Bulgaria) players
Gamma Ethniki players
Bulgarian expatriate footballers
Bulgarian expatriate sportspeople in Greece
Expatriate footballers in Greece
Sportspeople from Blagoevgrad Province
21st-century Bulgarian people